Romberger is a surname. It may refer to :
 Allen Isaiah "Dutch" Romberger (May 26, 1927 – May 26, 1983), a pitcher in Major League Baseball
  Gerhild Romberger, German contralto and academic teacher
 James Romberger (born 1958), an American fine artist and cartoonist known for his depictions of New York City's Lower East Side.